The 1992 Yugoslav Constitution was the constitution of the Federal Republic of Yugoslavia. It came into effect on 27 April 1992.

External links
 Text of the Constitution 

Yugoslavia
Serbia and Montenegro law
Government of Serbia and Montenegro
1992 documents
April 1992 events in Europe
1992 in politics
1992 in law